Kastanies railway stop is a railway stop in Kastanies, Greece. It was opened in 1971 by the OSE. The journey from Kastanies to Alexandroupoli takes around 128 mins.

History
The stop opened in 1971 as part of Greek efforts to create a passing loop for the CO. The then SEK designed and constructed a  direct connection between Nea Vyssa and Marasia within the Greek borders, bypassing Karaağaç. The new line section included Kastanies railway station and a new bridge over the river Ardas. Karaağaç railway station was abandoned, the track lifted and the building converted to other use.

Facilities
The stops is equipped solely with a waiting room on the single platform. The unstaffed halt has been the victim of repeated graffiti and vandalism.

Services
 the stop is served by only one daily pair of local trains to/from Alexandroupoli. There are currently no services to Svilengrad.

Stop layout

References

Buildings and structures in Evros (regional unit)